Phinam was a village development committee in Gorkha District in the Gandaki Zone of northern-central Nepal. It was merged into Gorkha Municipality in 2014. At the time of the 1991 Nepal census, it had a population of 2,993 and had 580 houses in the town.

Notable people from Phinam
Bhimsen Thapa, Mukhtiyar of Nepal

References

Populated places in Gorkha District